On December 3, 2009, telecommunications company Comcast announced its intent to acquire mass media company NBCUniversal from General Electric (GE). The acquisition was subject to scrutiny from activists and government officials; their concerns primarily surrounded the potential effects of the vertical integration that the acquisition could create, as Comcast is also heavily involved in cable television and internet services in many media markets. The deal went through on January 29, 2011, resulting in Comcast owning 51% of the company until March 19, 2013, when GE divested its stake to give Comcast sole ownership. Through this acquisition, Comcast gained ownership of the National Broadcasting Company (NBC), the Universal Pictures film studio, cable channels such as Syfy, CNBC and MSNBC, and Universal Parks & Resorts, among other assets owned by NBCUniversal. It has also integrated its own cable channels – including E! and Golf Channel – into NBCUniversal.

History

Background
Comcast was, at the time, the largest cable television provider in the United States. It also owned a number of major cable networks, including E!, Golf Channel, and Versus. In 2004, Comcast attempted a hostile takeover of The Walt Disney Company for $41 billion, which would have made Comcast the world's largest media conglomerate, if approved. The deal fell through, however; Comcast's motivation for the deal was centered around gaining control of ESPN, which a Comcast executive described as "the most important and valuable asset" in Disney's portfolio. The same year, General Electric acquired an 80% stake in Universal Studios from Vivendi, which merged into NBC to form NBC Universal. By 2009, the company's financial performance had struggled due in part to the poor performance of recent Universal Pictures' productions, and NBC ranked fourth at the time among the major US broadcast television networks. By contrast, some of its cable networks (such as MSNBC, Syfy, and USA Network) were reporting steady gains in viewership. After the failed Disney deal, Comcast focused on its existing networks (along with its Comcast SportsNet regional sports networks), and acquired a stake in the movie studio Metro-Goldwyn-Mayer (MGM).

Proposal
Negotiations between Comcast and NBC Universal for a potential acquisition began as early as March 2009; News Corporation and Time Warner were also reportedly interested in purchasing the studio. By September 2009, Comcast had negotiated a purchase of a stake in the company from GE, but the overall deal was held up by negotiations with Vivendi for the sale of its 20% stake to GE. On December 3, 2009, Comcast and NBC Universal confirmed a $6.5 billion deal to merge the two companies, pending approval from the United States Department of Justice Antitrust Division; the deal would be structured as sale of Vivendi's stake in the company to GE for $5.8 billion, followed by Comcast acquiring 51% controlling stake of NBC Universal, and contributing its existing media properties to the company, themselves valued at $7.25 billion. As a result, NBC Universal would become a joint venture between Comcast and GE, with Comcast holding a 51% majority stake. The deal, as a whole, valued NBC Universal at $30 billion. The deal included an option for General Electric to sell further stakes in the company to Comcast over a seven-year period, or Comcast to buy stakes at "specified times". Jeff Zucker was to remain CEO of NBC Universal after the acquisition, and remain headquartered in New York, but would report to Comcast.

Comcast CEO Brian L. Roberts described the deal as a "perfect fit" for the company, as Comcast would be able to bolster its role as a creator and distributor of content, with a particular emphasis on "[the] multiplatform ‘anytime, anywhere’ media that American consumers are demanding"; increasing access to NBC-owned content through various platforms. The deal would also add Comcast's own cable channels to NBCU's existing suite of cable networks, contributing to 82% of the merged company's total revenue. Despite the focus on cable, Comcast promised to remain committed to over-the-air broadcasting, and promised an increased amount of local news, children's programming, and Spanish language programming across various platforms, including over-the-air. GE's CEO Jeffrey R. Immelt justified the deal, citing a desire to move purely back into the industrial industry, and was also motivated by the Great Recession.

The deal was subject to the approval of the U.S. Federal Communications Commission (FCC); due to the magnitude of the deal, it was placed under heavy scrutiny by the Commission, who held hearings on the deal and its effects on the public's access to media.

Opposition 
The acquisition was opposed by a number of media activists, particularly those who were against vertical integration. Free Press argued that Comcast would use the deal to stifle competition in online video by restricting where NBC-owned content can be offered, and charge higher rates to television providers for accessing NBC-owned networks; having to pass these charges on to consumers. There were concerns from the owners of NBC's affiliates, who urged the FCC to require that Comcast maintain NBC programming on over-the-air television, and not move it exclusively to cable. A number of competing internet service and television providers urged the FCC to place conditions on Comcast if the deal were to be approved, including requiring that Comcast adhere to the principles of net neutrality, offer wholesale access to its broadband services, and place limits on how Comcast can leverage its NBC-owned stations in retransmission consent negotiations to inhibit competition. AOL proposed that the FCC enforce its program access rules for Comcast's online video content as well, requiring the provider to offer it to competitors at a fair rate. By June 22, 2010, over 32,000 comments had been sent to the FCC in relation to the deal.

Approval of acquisition

On January 18, 2011, the FCC and the United States Department of Justice approved the acquisition. Four months later, Meredith Attwell Baker, the FCC commissioner who approved the deal, was hired as a lobbyist by Comcast. Comcast and GE formed the joint venture holding company NBCUniversal, LLC on January 28, 2011. NBC Universal, Inc. became a wholly owned subsidiary of the holding company and was renamed as NBCUniversal Media, LLC on January 29, 2011.

As part of the acquisition, Comcast agreed to offer an internet service plan for qualifying low-income families for at least three years. The plan, "Internet Essentials", initially offered a 1.5-megabit connection for $9.95 per-month (increased to 5 megabits in 2013) with no activation or equipment fees, as well as an opportunity to purchase a discounted netbook and receive free "internet training". Of an estimated 2.60 million households eligible for the program, about 0.22 million households participated in the program as of June 2013. Comcast stated that the program would accept new customers for the duration of the mandate. In March 2014, as he met with FCC concerning a proposal to acquire Time Warner Cable, Comcast vice president David Cohen told reporters that the Internet Essentials program would be extended indefinitely.

Upon the completion of the acquisition, the company was slightly renamed to "NBCUniversal", with the change intended to reflect "unity" between NBC and Universal Pictures.

Divestment by GE
Comcast intended to buy out the rest of GE's stake of NBCUniversal over the following seven years. Ownership remained split at 51%–49% for two years, and later, on February 12, 2013, Comcast announced its intention to complete the purchase all at once and assume 100% ownership of the company by the end of March. The deal was officially completed on March 19, 2013.

Scale of new company
The merger expanded Comcast's scale significantly; Comcast's position as a cable television provider vertical integration with its ownership of NBC Universal's broadcast television and cable networks, while Comcast's existing cable networks (including E! Golf Channel, and Versus) were horizontally integrated with the television properties of NBC Universal. Mark Leccese of The Boston Globe noted that the combined company consisted of "10 TV and movie production studios (including Universal Pictures), 20 cable channels, 11 regional broadcast TV stations, 15 Telemundo stations, 9 regional sports cable networks, one regional news cable station (New England Cable News), a whole bunch of websites, two pro sports teams in Philadelphia and two arenas, a food service vendor, a ticket agency, and four theme parks. And some other stuff."

Influence

The video marketplace has changed structurally with or without Comcast-NBCUniversal acquisition. More and more videos, programs and advertisements are displayed on the Internet, not the traditional media channel, television. The video business model has gradually changed as time goes by. Comcast has reached such a significant scale that it now owns a huge large amount of media and entertainment properties. However, facing the uncertainty of video marketplace, many people proposed their concerns:

Impact on the video market

One of the claims is "Comcast would be able to use its vertically integrated position to deny rival distributors access to programming or to raise the cost of that programming". Comcast-NBC will face two rival distributors – the satellite and telephone company and the new entrant. Of course, both of them are worrying about the domination which Comcast-NBCUniversal may be capable of establishing and the entry barrier. The big challenge for the satellite and telephone company is to find a new business model to convince the programmers that their model will benefit them more than Comcast-NBCUniversal. However, Comcast-NBCUniversal also keeps improving their business model, which is unhappy to the new entrant.

The other claim is that "Comcast will use the merger to change NBC into a cable network, at the expense of local programming". Some observers predict that Comcast may convert NBC to a cable network. They think that Comcast must have to make some changes because NBC broadcast station traditionally has only one revenue path, the advertising;

Impact on competition, diversity and localism of media company

As far as media ownership, competition, diversity and localism are the three major topics. Once two or more media company amalgamated, such as the case of the merger of News Corp/DirecTV and Sirius-XM, many critics suggested that a merged company with too much power will harm the competition, diversity of the media marketplace and even the democracy of this country. Some of them directly called it "merger to monopoly".  FCC Commissioner Copps once said, "It will create a single company with enormous influence over politics, art and culture across the nation and especially in the New York metropolitan area."  Localism may also be affected by this merger. The new entity who acts as a gatekeeper could limit the local or independent voices to get to the slots on the media distribution system.  Adam Thierer has conveyed this concern, "The new entity will have an incentive to prioritize NBC shows over other local and independent voices and programs, making it even harder to find alternatives on the cable dial."

Benefits to shareholders and consumers

One of the claims is "A combined Comcast-NBC Universal might have the unique ability to craft new business models that benefit consumers." With the development of new digital technologies to distribute videos, advertising revenues have not been generated in the new market. Therefore, these enterprise operators have to find out a new business model in order to make the revenues financially available. Facing the uncertain environment, the Comcast Senior Vice President for Corporate Development, Robert Pick still shows his determination. He says, "the combination would ameliorate the negotiations friction that had made it difficult for Comcast, primarily a distribution and communications company, to convince content owners and programmers to work with us to create and deliver more content to consumers in a greater variety of ways."

Impact on price of video markets

Many observers predict that the price of distributing videos is going to fall dramatically in the near future because three distribution products of Comcast (Broadcast-TV-Internet) are all merging into the network. Wall Street Journal business columnist Holman Jenkins says, "Customers want the product for free. Comcast's lifeblood, the $100-a-month cable bill and the $50-a-month broadband bill, increasingly look like duplicative expenses. And so on." In order to recover the lost revenue from content, Comcast-NBCUniversal may enhance their business on service of advertising, subscription etc.

On-air effects 
The first major on-air effects of the deal occurred in February 2011, when Comcast began to align its sports properties with the NBC Sports division; the Comcast Sports Group was renamed NBC Sports Group, with  Mark Lazarus, formerly the head of Turner Entertainment Group, heading its cable networks. NBC Sports talent could now appear on Comcast networks such as Golf Channel; NBC's golf coverage was re-branded as Golf Channel on NBC beginning at the 2011 WGC-Accenture Match Play Championship. On August 1, 2011, Comcast announced that its Versus network would be renamed NBC Sports Network on January 2, 2012, to directly align it with NBC Sports.

The acquisition was announced during the fourth season  of the NBC sitcom 30 Rock, which depicts a fictitious version of the network. The acquisition of NBC by Kabletown, a large Philadelphia-based cable company, and its consequences became a recurring storyline. The January 27, 2011 episode "Operation Righteous Cowboy Lightning", which aired the day Comcast's Steve Burke met his new NBC employees, opens with a scene depicting a Kabletown sign being installed on 30 Rockefeller Center to replace the existing neon GE sign. In 2014, Comcast received approval by the city of New York to perform a similar modification to the actual 30 Rock, replacing the GE lettering with signs depicting its corporate logo and the NBC peacock.

See also 
Acquisition of 21st Century Fox by Disney, a corporate act of The Walt Disney Company which acquired the majority of 21st Century Fox assets, mainly motion picture and television studios and entertainment pay TV channels.
2019 merger of CBS and Viacom, a media merger deal that combined the operations of CBS Corporation and Viacom, which had previously split in 2005, into a new company called ViacomCBS (now Paramount Global).
Merger of Sprint Corporation and T-Mobile US
Concentration of media ownership

Further reading
 Columbia Journalism Review "Who Owns What" webpage
 Free Presss "Ownership Chart: The Big Six."

References

Cable television companies of the United States
Comcast
NBCUniversal
2011 in economics
2011 in the United States
2011 in American television